Kingsnakes are colubrid New World members of the genus Lampropeltis, which includes 26 species. Among these, about 45 subspecies are recognized. They are nonvenomous and ophiophagous in diet.

Description
Kingsnakes vary widely in size and coloration. They can be as small as 24" (61cm) or as long as 60" (152cm). Some kingsnakes are colored in muted browns to black, while others are brightly marked in white, reds, yellows, grays, and lavenders that form rings, longitudinal stripes, speckles, and saddle-shaped bands.

Most kingsnakes have quite vibrant patterns. Some species, such as the scarlet kingsnake, Mexican milk snake, and red milk snake, have coloration and patterning that can cause them to be confused with the highly venomous coral snakes. One of the mnemonic rhymes to help people distinguish between coral snakes and their nonvenomous lookalikes in the United States is "red on black, a friend of Jack; red on yellow, kill a fellow". Other variations include "red on yellow kill a fellow, red on black venom lack", and referencing the order of traffic lights "yellow, red, stop!"  All these mnemonics apply only to the three species of coral snakes native to the southern United States: Micrurus fulvius (the eastern or common coral snake), Micrurus tener (the Texas coral snake), and Micruroides euryxanthus (the Arizona coral snake). Coral snakes found in other parts of the world can have distinctly different patterns, such as having red bands touching black bands, having only pink and blue bands, or having no bands at all.

Etymology
Lampropeltis includes the Greek words for "shiny shield":   ("shiny") +   ("peltē shield") +  (a Latin suffix). The name is given to them in reference to their smooth, enamel-like dorsal scales.

The "king" in the common name (as with the king cobra) refers to its preying on other snakes.

Taxonomy
Taxonomic reclassification of the kingsnakes is an ongoing process and different sources often disagree, one source granting full species status to a group of these snakes that another source considers a subspecies group. In the case of L. catalinensis, for example, only a single specimen exists, so classification is not necessarily finite. In addition, hybridization between species with overlapping geographic ranges is not uncommon, confusing taxonomists further.

Range
Kingsnakes are native to North America, where they are found all over the United States and into Mexico. This genus has adapted to a wide variety of habitats, including tropical forests, shrublands, and deserts.

Predators
Kingsnakes are often preyed upon by large vertebrates, such as birds of prey. Tarantulas also sometimes prey on them; however, a considerable threat also comes from other kingsnakes. All species of kingsnakes are known snake- and reptile-eaters, and likely won't turn down a chance to prey on their local competitors.

Behavior and diet
Kingsnakes are primarily terrestrial, but they are also known to be capable climbers and swimmers.

Kingsnakes use constriction to kill their prey and tend to be opportunistic in their diet. They're known to seek out and eat other snakes (ophiophagy), including venomous snakes, like rattlesnakes, cottonmouths, and copperheads. Some known non-venomous prey species of the kingsnake include gopher snakes, corn snakes, bullsnakes, garter snakes, rosy boa, water snakes, and brown snakes. Kingsnakes also eat many species of lizards, rodents, birds, and eggs. The common kingsnake is known to be immune to the venom of other snakes and does eat rattlesnakes, but it is not necessarily immune to the venom of snakes from different localities.

Kingsnakes such as the California kingsnake can exert twice as much constriction force relative to body size as rat snakes and pythons. Scientists believe that such strong coils may be an adaptation to eating snakes, and other reptile prey, which can endure lower blood-oxygen levels before asphyxiating.

List of kingsnake species and subspecies

Kingsnake species and subspecies include (listed here alphabetically by specific and subspecific name):
Guatemalan milk snake, Lampropeltis abnorma (Bocourt, 1886)
Gray-banded kingsnake, Lampropeltis alterna (A. E. Brown, 1901)
Mexican milk snake, Lampropeltis annulata Kennicott, 1860
California kingsnake, Lampropeltis californiae (Blainville, 1835)
Prairie kingsnake, Lampropeltis calligaster (Harlan, 1827)
Santa Catalina Island kingsnake, Lampropeltis catalinensis (Van Denburgh & Slevin, 1921)
Scarlet kingsnake or scarlet milk snake, Lampropeltis elapsoides (Holbrook, 1838)
Short-tailed snake, Lampropeltis extenuata (R.E. Brown, 1890) 
Central Plains milk snake, Lampropeltis gentilis (Baird & Girard, 1853)
Common kingsnake, Lampropeltis getula (Linnaeus, 1766)
Brooks' kingsnake, L. g. brooksi Barbour, 1919
Florida kingsnake, L. g. floridana (Blanchard, 1919) 
Eastern kingsnake, L. g. getula (Linnaeus, 1766)
Apalachicola Lowlands kingsnake, L. g. meansi Krysko & Judd, 2006
Mexican black kingsnake, L. g. nigrita Zweifel & Norris, 1955
Greer's kingsnake, Lampropeltis greeri (Webb, 1961)
Speckled kingsnake, Lampropeltis holbrooki Stejneger, 1902
Madrean mountain kingsnake, Lampropeltis knoblochi Taylor, 1940
Nuevo León kingsnake, Lampropeltis leonis (Günther, 1893)
Mexican kingsnake, Lampropeltis mexicana (Garman, 1884) 
Ecuadorian milk snake, Lampropeltis micropholis Cope, 1860
Black kingsnake, Lampropeltis nigra (Yarrow, 1882)
South Florida mole kingsnake, Lampropeltis occipitolineata Price, 1987
Central American milk snake, Lampropeltis polyzona Cope, 1860
Arizona mountain kingsnake, Lampropeltis pyromelana (Cope, 1866)
Utah mountain kingsnake, L. p. infralabialis W. Tanner, 1953
Arizona mountain kingsnake, L. p. pyromelana (Cope, 1866)
Mole kingsnake, Lampropeltis rhombomaculata (Holbrook, 1840)
Ruthven's kingsnake, Lampropeltis ruthveni (Blanchard, 1920)
Desert kingsnake, Lampropeltis splendida (Baird & Girard, 1853)
Milk snake, Lampropeltis triangulum (Lacépède, 1789)
Lampropeltis webbi Bryson, Dixon & Lazcano, 2005
California mountain kingsnake, Lampropeltis zonata (Lockington, 1876 ex Blainville, 1835)
San Pedro kingsnake, L. z. agalma (Van Denburgh & Slevin, 1923)
Todos Santos Island kingsnake, L. z. herrerae (Van Denburgh & Slevin, 1923)
Sierra Nevada mountain kingsnake, L. z. multicincta (Yarrow, 1882)
Coast Ranges mountain kingsnake, L. z. multifasciata (Bocourt, 1886)
San Bernardino mountain kingsnake, L. z. parvirubra Zweifel, 1952
San Diego mountain kingsnake, L. z. pulchra Zweifel, 1952
Saint Helena mountain kingsnake, L. z. zonata (Lockington, 1876 ex Blainville, 1835)

Additionally, Pyron and Burbrink have argued that the short-tailed snake (Stilosoma extenuatum) (Brown, 1890) should be included in Lampropeltis.

References

Further reading
Hubbs, Brian (2009). Common Kingsnakes: A Natural History of Lampropeltis getula. Tempe, Arizona: Tricolor Books.

External links 

Desert USA: Common Kingsnake
Common Kingsnake - Lampropeltis getula Species account from the Iowa Reptile and Amphibian Field Guide
Kingsnake eating a garter snake

Lampropeltis
Taxa named by Leopold Fitzinger